George Hallett may refer to:

George E. Hallett, architect with Hallett & Rawson, Iowa
George E. A. Hallett (1890–1982), pioneer aviator
George Hallett (photographer) (1942–2020), Cape Town photographer
George Hervey Hallett Jr. (1895–1985), civic advocate and naturalist